Bambir is an Armenian rock band from Gyumri.  Spanning 4 decades and with more than 50 musicians passing through its ranks, the band has moved into its second generation- as in, sons of the original members are operating as a separate four-piece that is still part of the original ensemble.

Founded by Jag Barseghyan in the 1970s in Gyumri, Armenia, Bambir was lauded as one of the best rock groups in the Soviet Union, performing original material, traditional Armenian songs, and modern arrangements of Komitas and medieval Armenian music.  Today, Jag Barseghyan records solo albums, ensemble albums, and performs with original members of The Bambir and other international musicians. In 1982 Bambir won the Folk Music Award at the International Festival in Lida, Belarus. They celebrated their 20th anniversary in Moscow in 1998 and in Gyumri at their first Biennial.  On their 30th anniversary, they released Armenian Scotch, an album dedicated to the 140th anniversary of Hovhannes Tumanyan and the 250th anniversary of Robert Burns.

A separate but connected four-piece rock band The Bambir (Progressive Ethnic Rock'n'Roll) formed in Gyumri later in 1994, by Narek (son of Jag), Arman Kocharyan, Arik Bambir Grigoryan and Vardan Paremuzyan. While they started playing together in Armenia, they've earned a reputation in Russia, France, the United States, Turkey, and beyond.  They have been based in Ireland as of January 2012.  They write and perform their own music written by Narek and Arik, and are known for their vibrant stage presence in their live shows and unique sound.

Early history

In the sixties Jag began traveling to the city of Gyumri, traditionally Armenia's city of arts and one of the cultural centers of the Soviet Union.  While there weren't many people listening to rock music in Yerevan at the time, an underground scene seemed to be thriving in Gyumri.  It was there that he began to find like-minded individuals and appreciators of the music he loved. He started jamming with Robert Kocharyan (not the former Armenian president) on bass, Suren Martirosyan on guitar, and Levon "Watts" Nouroyan on drums, calling themselves Angin Qarer ("precious stones", in the Armenian language), playing hard rock.  They soon morphed into their folk "bard rock" style, arranging pieces by Komitas and moving on to their own original material, changing their name to Bambir.  Performances and many albums followed and they toured Armenia, Russia, Europe and the United States. Members of the original band reunite for special concerts, and Jag continues to actively record and collaborate with local and international artists.  He has been awarded by the Armenian Ministry of Culture for his achievements in Contemporary Armenian Music.

Second Generation
Narek (son of Jag) and Arman (son of Robert Kocharyan, an original member of "Angin Qarer"), friends since birth, grew up in Gyumri in the creative environment built by their fathers and community. They picked up the guitar and bass at a very young age. They met Arik (flute) when they were nine years old, and their trio began jamming and performing on their own.  In 1999-2000 they travelled to Los Angeles and New York, and even recorded an album (never released) in California but had to return to Armenia, and school.  Ashot Korganyan joined them on drums in 2001.  As the boys grew up in Gyumri they became better musicians and started playing more and more.  The four-piece returned to Los Angeles in 2007, and Ashot left the band upon their return.  That same year, the now trio travelled to Shoushi in Artsakh for a music festival and Narek, Arman, and Arik met Vardan, originally from Vanadzor, Lori region. They continue to work with Jag.
	
The band's notoriety grew as they finished university and continued to gig, and they started to attract international attention.  They played in Moscow, Paris, Istanbul, Beirut, Georgia, and all over Armenia, placing third in 2010's Eurovoice Competition.  They made the decision to make a go of breaking into the European market, and moved to Dublin in January 2012.  Their incredible musicianship and intense energy on-stage made them stand out immediately, and it wasn't long before they were booked for festivals like KnockanStockan, No Place Like Dome, Body&Soul, and Electric Picnic, as well as special events like launches and Tower Records' 19th birthday. They became known for their relentless gigging, sometimes playing 3 shows/night- their final performances in Dublin, 2012 were on Arthur's Day when they played 3 times in The Mercantile, The Stag's Head, and The Sweeney Mongrel. State called them "Ireland's hairiest and hardest working band," featuring them as part of their 2012 Electric Picnic coverage. They appeared on Near FM, Radio Nova 100FM (Ireland), Dublin City FM, and WDAR. While much of their live sets in Ireland are in English, they continue to perform and write songs in the Armenian language as well. The band has recorded with international musicians like Dietmar Bonnen.
 
They have been based in Ireland as of January 2012.  They write and perform their own music written by Narek and Arik, and are known for their vibrant stage presence in their live shows and unique sound.

Bambir Members

Present Members:
Gaguik "Jag" Barseghyan (founder) 1978–present
Grigor Mirzoyan -cello-2012–present
Anna Kocharyan -violin-2017–present
Sergo Tonoyan -keyboards-1982-85/2012–present
Narek Barseghyan – guitar, vocals 2002–2017
Arik Grigoryan – flute, percussions, vocals 2002–present
Arman Kocharyan – bass, vocals 2002–present
Vardan Paremuzyan– drums (2007–2017), vocals

The Bambir Members (Second generation):

Narek Barseghyan – guitar, vocals/1994–2017
Arik Grigoryan – flute, percussions, vocals/1994–present
Arman Kocharyan – bass, vocals/1994–present
Vardan Paremuzyan– drums, vocals/2007–2017

Past Members:
Tatul Yeghiazaryan† 1993 - 1999
Gourgen Hakobjanyan 1978 -2009
Gaguik Hakobjanyan 1978 - 1983
Artash Harutyunyan 1978 - 1983
Mkrtich Hovhannisyan 1979 -1984
Vrezh Aramyan 1979-1982
Grigor Virabyan 1982 - 2001
Armen Karapetyan 1983 - 1988
Vardan Varosyan 1985 -1988
Armen Sargsyan 1980 - 1998
Edvard Yuzbashyan 1980 - 1984
Murad Gasabyan bass 1983 - 1993
Hrant Melqonyan bass 1987 - 1993
Hakob Yesayan 1989 - 1993
Vladimir Voskanyan 1997 - 1999
Artour Hovhanisyan 1986 -1993
Varouzh Vardanyan 1989-1990
Ashot Hovhanisyan 1987 - 1993
Seiran Vardanyan 1998 - 2002
Levon Davtyan 2002 - 2004
Ani Arakyan 2009–2015
Armen Karjyan 2012-2015
Ashot Korganyan - drums/2001 - 2007 
Mher Vardikyan - guitar/1997 -2002
Garik Barseghyan 1992 - 1993

'Angin Qarer - "Priceless Stones
Gagik "Jag" Barseghyan - Guitar 1969-1978
Souren Martirosyan - Guitar 1969-1978
Levon Nouroyan - Drums 1969-1978
Robert Kocharyan - Bass 1969-1978
Matos Margaryan - 1969-1978

Discography and Releases
Bambir (Jag):
 1999 – Quake
 2003 - Quake Released by Pomegranate Music Label http://pomegranatemusic.com/recordings/bambir/   http://www.allmusic.com/album/quake-mw0000670482   http://www.globalrhythm.net/WorldMusicCDReviews/MiddleEastNorthAfrica/BAMBIR.cfm
 2003 – J&G
 2005 – Blind Alley
 2008 - Alexandropol- recorded with “Dietmar Bonnen" (Live) 
 2011 – Armenian Scotch

Recorded albums, EP sessions, Singles by The Bambir (Second generation):
2003 - "Alabalanitsa" (Nursery Rhymes) - Single 
2004 - "Dark City Train"  Single  
2005 - "BBR".  Best Folk Rock Album 2005 at the Armenian Music Awards. LA, California, in 2005.
2007 - "The Black" Album 
2010 - "Thats Fine with Us" Single
2012 - "Urbane/Urban" Single 
2013 - "Do You Love Me" Single 
2013 - "Index Sessions" EP
2013 - "Imitate" Single
2015 - "Upsessions" Album

Best Rock Band at the Armenian National Music Award: (2003, 2004) two years in a row.

Music videos
 2003 - «Alabalanitsa» Music video
 2007 - «Children's games»Music Video
 2004 - «Dark City Train» Music Video
 2010 - «Thats Fine with Us» Music Video 
 2012 - «Urbane/Urban» Music Video
 2013 - «Do you love me» Music Video
 2013 - «Khio» Music Video
 2014 - «Black Blouse» Music Video

References

10. http://www.allmusic.com/album/quake-mw0000670482
11. http://www.globalrhythm.net/WorldMusicCDReviews/MiddleEastNorthAfrica/BAMBIR.cfm

External links
 About Bambir
 Youtube Channel
 The Bambir's Facebook Page
 Jag's Facebook Page

Armenian musical groups
Armenian rock musicians
Armenian rock music groups
1978 establishments in the Soviet Union
Musical groups established in 1978
Soviet rock music groups